Fomitopsis spraguei is a polypore isolated from Washington and Oregon. It can function as a plant pathogen for Quercus species, or as a detritivore for various hardwood logs.

Identification 
F. spraguei is a perennial fungi. It is sessile, meaning it sticks out from the wood, and sometimes curls up on the edges. It can grow to up to 4 cm thick. The top surface can be ivory white to grey, without any bands or rings. It may have matted "hairs" or be smooth, there is some variation within the species. The bottom of the fungus may be white, buff, or pale brown, and may have a pink tint. The inside of the fungus if broken open is tough and corky, coloured white to grey. There are 3-6 round pores per millimetre.

See also
 List of Platanus diseases
 List of sweetgum diseases

References

Fungal tree pathogens and diseases
spraguei
Fungi described in 1886